Hóa Thượng is a township and capital of Đồng Hỷ District in Thái Nguyên Province, Vietnam.

References

Populated places in Thái Nguyên province
District capitals in Vietnam